Advancetown is a rural outer locality in the City of Gold Coast, Queensland, Australia.

Geography 
Advancetown is situated in the Gold Coast hinterland. Its mountainous terrain facilated the construction of the Hinze Dam which impounds the Nerang River and Little Nerang Creek to create Advancetown Lake. The lake is the dominant feature in the south of the locality; it supplies water for most of the Gold Coast. 

Two named peaks within the locality are:
The northern part of the locality, downstream from the dam, is lower and flatter and has mixed use with rural residential areas and rural areas (mostly grazing on native vegetation). One landmark in this area is Latimers Crossing, a crossing point of the Nerang River between Advancetown and Gilston.

Road infrastructure
Nerang–Murwillumbah Road (State Route 97) runs through from north to south.

History
The mountain Mudgeeraba  takes its name from the Bundjalung language words mudherri meaning sticky and ba meaning place, that is, a muddy place.

The mountain Pages Pinnacle is named after local land owner Sir Earle Christmas Grafton Page.

The area first attracted timber-cutters in the 1870s because of the abundant supply of good quality timber. In 1881 David Yuan established at saw mill and European settlement began. A small settlement sprang up as a rest point for the bullock teams hauling timber to the railway at Nerang. As late as the 1930s, there were still up to 24 bullock teams operating in the area.

In 1884 the first hotel was built by W. H. Turner called the Beechmont Hotel. In 1905, Ernest Belliss opened a hotel on the corner of Numinbah Road and a bullock road from Beechmont known as the Black Shoot; he called it the Advancetown Hotel. Belliss also donated land for the Advancetown school, which made the name endure. Belliss sold the hotel in March 1924 and the timber building burned down in July 1933. A new Advancetown Hotel was built and opened in February 1934.

Advancetown State School opened in 1909, but then closed in 1913. It reopened in 1918 but had temporary closures in 1921 and 1952. It closed permanently in 1960.

Hinze Dam was first completed in 1976 (Stage 1), providing a storage of 42,400 million litres of water to surrounding residents. The dam named after local pioneers Carl and Johanna Hinze (grandparents of Queensland politician Russ Hinze) who lived in the valley that was flooded by the dam. The settlement of Advancetown including the school (which was closed by then) was lost under the dam's waters. As the settlement of Advancetown was gone, on 31 March 1979 the name Advancetown was dropped in favour of Latimer, after nearby Latimer Creek,  but the name Advancetown was restored on 11 May 1985.

In 1989 Stage 2 of the dam was completed, increasing the storage to 161,070 million litres of water. 

Advancetown was part of the Shire of Albert until it was amalgamated into the City of Gold Coast in 1995.

In 2011 Stage 3 of the dam was completed, increasing the storage to 310,730 million litres of water. It reportedly cost $395 million dollars.

At the 2011 Census the population was 352.

Heritage listings 

There are a number of heritage sites in Advancetown, including:

 163-179 Latimers Crossing Road: Avenue of Commemorative Trees

Education 
There are no schools in Advancetown. Given that the populated areas of the locality are in the north, the nearest primary schools are Nerang State School in neighbouring Nerang to the north-east and Gilston State School in neighbouring Gilston to the east. The nearest secondary school is Nerang State High School in Nerang.

Sports
Although The Grand Golf Club has its entrance at 364 Gilston Road in neighbouring Gilston, most of the course is in Advancetown, accessed by a bridge over the Nerang River. This private club has a 19-hole golf course designed by Greg Norman.

Attractions 

The Hinze Dam offers a number of visitor attractions. Accessed from Advancetown Road at the top of dam wall is a visitor centre with education displays, a cafe and parkland with picnic facilities. Below the spillway are picnic areas with barbeques. Across the spillway is a network of purpose-built mountain bike trails. In the two arms of the lake there are the eastern  and western  boat ramps for non-motorised boating and fishing (catch-and-release only due to mercury levels). The eastern boat ramp is accessed from Range Road, while the western boat ramp is accessed via Nerang Murwillumbah Road. There are also a number of walking trails.

Climate
Advancetown has a humid subtropical climate (Köppen climate classification Cfa). There is a weather station located within Advancetown, at Hinze Dam. Record keeping commenced in 1974.

See also

 List of Gold Coast suburbs

References

Sources

External links 

  — includes Advancetown

 
Localities in Queensland